Grol can refer to:

 Grol, the medieval name of Groenlo, a Dutch fortified city and hometown of Grolsch
 GROL, the US General radiotelephone operator license